Vinduja Menon is an Indian actress known for her work in Malayalam cinema. Her most popular role is the one from the 1994 film  Pavithram. She played  as Mohanlal's sister in that movie. She took formal classical dance lessons from her mother and at present made her career as a dance teacher.

Background 
Vinduja made her movie debut as a child in the movie, Onnanam Kunnil Oradi Kunnil, released in 1985. She is a former Kalathilakam from Kerala School Kalolsavam in 1991, and the first artiste from Thiruvananthapuram to receive this honor. She studied at H.H. Maharani Sethu Parvathi Bai N.S.S. College for Women in Karamana and did masters in Government College for Women, Thiruvananthapuram. She is conferred doctorate from Madurai Kamaraj University. She started her career as a drama artist.

Personal life
Her father is K.P. Vishwanathan Menon, a Government officer, and her mother is Kalamandalam Vimala Menon, founder of Kerala Natya Academy, a prestigious dance institution. She has a brother, Vinod Kumar. She is married to Rajesh Kumar and has a daughter, Neha. She lives in Malaysia with her family and teaches dance under Kerala Natya Academy and occasionally acts in serials. She has also been a judge on the reality show "Dance Party" on Kairali TV.

Filmography

Playback singing
 Kaavum Kovilakavum ...	Aabharanachaarthu	2002	
 Kamalappoovu Neeyalle ...	Raajamudra (dubbed film)   2008

Television
All programs are serials, unless otherwise noted.

References

External links

 Vinduja Menon at MSI
 http://www.malayalachalachithram.com/profiles.php?i=7452

Actresses in Malayalam cinema
Indian film actresses
Year of birth missing (living people)
Living people
Actresses from Thiruvananthapuram
Indian television actresses
Actresses in Malayalam television
Indian women playback singers
Singers from Thiruvananthapuram
Malayalam playback singers
20th-century Indian actresses
21st-century Indian actresses
Child actresses in Malayalam cinema